Aikin Grove (also Aiken Grove) is an unincorporated community in Red River County, Texas, United States.

History
A. M. Aikin, Jr. (1905-1981), Texas state representative, was born in Aikin Grove.

Notes

Unincorporated communities in Red River County, Texas
Unincorporated communities in Texas